Namor, also known as the Sub-Mariner, is a character appearing in American comic books published by Marvel Comics. Debuting in early 1939, the character was created by writer-artist Bill Everett for comic book packager Funnies Inc. Initially created for the unreleased comic Motion Picture Funnies Weekly, the character first appeared publicly in Marvel Comics #1 (cover-dated Oct. 1939), which was the first comic book from Timely Comics, the 1930s–1940s predecessor of Marvel Comics. During that period, known to historians and fans as the Golden Age of Comic Books, the Sub-Mariner was one of Timely's top three characters, along with Captain America and the original Human Torch. Moreover, Namor has also been described as the first comic book antihero.

The mutant son of a human sea captain and a princess of the mythical undersea kingdom of Atlantis, Namor possesses the superstrength and aquatic abilities of the Homo mermanus race, as well as the mutant ability of flight, along with other superhuman powers. Through the years, he has been portrayed as an antihero, alternately as a good-natured but short-fused superhero or a hostile invader seeking vengeance for perceived wrongs that misguided surface-dwellers committed against his kingdom. A historically important and relatively popular Marvel character, Namor has served directly with the Avengers, the Fantastic Four, the Invaders, the Defenders, the X-Men and the Illuminati as well as serving as a foil to them on occasion.

Tenoch Huerta Mejía portrays Namor in his live-action debut in the Marvel Cinematic Universe film Black Panther: Wakanda Forever (2022).

Publication history

Creation
Namor was created by writer-artist Bill Everett. The character first appeared in April 1939 in the prototype for a planned giveaway comic titled Motion Picture Funnies Weekly, which was produced by the comic book packager Funnies Inc. The only eight known samples among those created to send to theater owners were discovered in the estate of the deceased publisher in 1974. Allegedly, Everett created Namor because he was informed that Carl Burgos had created the Human Torch, who can manipulate fire, and he wanted to play on the notion of "fire and water". His interest in "anything nautical, [and having] to do with the sea", also factored in Namor's creation and origin.

Everett stated that the inspiration for creating the character was Samuel Taylor Coleridge's poem The Rime of the Ancient Mariner (1798), and came up with "Namor" by writing down noble-sounding names backwards and thought Roman / Namor looked the best. He described the character as an "ultra-man of the deep [who] lives on land and in the sea, flies in the air, [and] has the strength of a thousand [surface] men". When the giveaway idea with Motion Picture Funnies Weekly fell through, Everett used the character for Marvel Comics #1, the first comic book by Funnies, Inc. client Timely Comics, predecessor of Marvel Comics. The final panel of the earlier, unpublished eight-page Sub-Mariner story had included a "Continued Next Week" box that reappeared, sans lettering, in an expanded 12-page story.

Golden Age

In his first appearances Namor was an enemy of the United States. Comics historian Les Daniels noted that "Namor was a freak in the service of chaos. Although the Sub-Mariner acted like a villain, his cause had some justice, and readers reveled in his assaults on civilization. His enthusiastic fans weren't offended by the carnage he created as he wrecked everything from ships to skyscrapers." Everett's antihero would eventually battle Carl Burgos' android superhero, the Human Torch, when in 1940 Namor threatened to sink the island of Manhattan underneath a tidal wave. When the U.S. entered World War II, Namor would aid the Allies of World War II against Adolf Hitler and the Axis powers. Supporting characters included Betty Dean, a New York City policewoman introduced in Marvel Mystery Comics #3 (and later known as Betty Dean-Prentiss), who was a steady companion, and his cousins Namora and Dorma.

Namor starred in the Golden Age comic book Sub-Mariner, published quarterly, then thrice-yearly, and finally bimonthly, from issues #1–32 (Fall 1941–June 1949). A backup feature each issue starred the detective-superhero the Angel. Along with many other Timely characters, Namor disappeared a few years after the end of World War II and the decline in popularity of superhero comics. He briefly fought crime as a member of the post-war superhero team the All-Winners Squad, and, through a 1970s retcon, was given a history of having fought with the Allies during World War II in the superhero team the Invaders. Both of these super-groups were built around the core of Namor, Captain America, and the original Human Torch. The Sub-Mariner experienced a brief revival in the mid-1950s at Atlas Comics, the 1950s iteration of Marvel. Along with Captain America and the original Human Torch, he was revived in Young Men #24. Soon afterward, Sub-Mariner was revived with issues #33–42 (April 1954 – Oct. 1955). During this time, Namora had her own spin-off series. A planned live-action television program starring Namor did not appear and the revival of the comic book series was cancelled a second time.

Silver Age
Namor returned in Fantastic Four #4 (May 1962), where a member of the titular superhero team, Johnny Storm, the new Human Torch, discovers him living as an amnesiac homeless man in the Bowery section of Manhattan. Storm helps him recover his memory, and Namor immediately returns to his undersea kingdom—later identified as Atlantis in Fantastic Four Annual #1 (June 1963). Finding it destroyed from nuclear testing, Namor assumes his people are scattered and that he will never find them. He again becomes an antihero during this period, as two elements – a thirst for vengeance and a quest for identity – would dominate the Sub-Mariner stories of the 1960s. He was both a villain and a hero – striking against the human race who destroyed his home, but showing a great deal of noblesse oblige to individuals.

Initially, Namor variously finds himself allied with the supervillains Doctor Doom and Magneto, but his royal nobility and stubborn independent streak make these alliances-of-convenience short-lived. Namor's revival was a hit with readers, but Marvel could not give him his own title due to publication and distribution restrictions that would not be lifted until 1968. Instead, Namor was given numerous guest-appearances – including in Daredevil #7 (April 1965), a rare superhero story drawn by comics great Wally Wood – and a starring feature in the split-title comic Tales to Astonish (beginning issue #70, Aug. 1965). By now, during a period fans and historians call the Silver Age of Comic Books, he is more authoritative, arrogant and solemn than the impetuous youthful character of the 1940s and mid-1950s, speaking in neo-Shakespearean dialogue rather than the more colloquial speech of his youth, often shouting his battle cry, "Imperius Rex!".

Bronze Age
He was spun off into his own title, the 1968–74 series Sub-Mariner. The super-villain Tiger Shark was introduced in issue #5 by writer Roy Thomas and artist John Buscema and the super-hero Stingray in issue #19 by Thomas and Bill Everett. Some of the later issues of this Sub-Mariner series are notable for having been written and drawn by the character's creator, Bill Everett, shortly before his death; as well, they reintroduced a now-older Namora, and introduced her daughter, Namorita Prentiss. By now more of a reluctant superhero "the Sub-Mariner was perfect for the Marvel Age of angst-ridden protagonists. Noble yet misunderstood, powerful yet thwarted ... [he was] portrayed as a regal monarch – a king without a country." The final issue,  #72 (Sept. 1974), was written by Steve Skeates and featured an unofficial intercompany crossover with the last issue of DC Comics' Aquaman series. A five- to six-page backup feature, "Tales of Atlantis", chronicling the undersea kingdom from its ancient origins, appeared in issues #62–66 (June–Oct. 1973), written by Steve Gerber, with penciling by Howard Chaykin and later Jim Mooney. After the cancellation of Sub-Mariner, Namor co-starred with Doctor Doom in the Super-Villain Team-Up series. The series suffered from mediocre sales due to its lack of a stable creative team, and following issue #13 Namor was dropped from the co-star spot. Marvel published a four-issue miniseries a decade later, Prince Namor, the Sub-Mariner (Sept.-Dec. 1984), by scripter/co-plotter J. M. DeMatteis, penciler/co-plotter Bob Budiansky, and inker Danny Bulanadi.

Modern Age
The 12-issue maxiseries The Saga of the Sub-Mariner (Nov. 1988 – Oct. 1989) provided a retrospective of Namor's past adventures while tying up loose plot threads and resolving contradictions that had accumulated over the character's decades of published history. Namor again received an ongoing series in 1990. Namor, the Sub-Mariner, which ran 62 issues (April 1990 – May 1995), was initially written and penciled by John Byrne who took over the inking as well from issues #4–21. Unlike all of Namor's previous series, the cover logo emphasized the character's name rather than the "Sub-Mariner" epithet. From #26–38, the series' penciler and eventual penciler-inker was then-newcomer Jae Lee, with Bob Harras scripting from #33–40. After three fill-in issues, the remainder of the series was written by Glenn Herdling and pencilled by Geof Isherwood. This series followed Namor as CEO of Oracle, Inc., a corporation devoted to reducing pollution, particularly in the oceans, and provided the stage for the return of the 1970s martial artist superhero Iron Fist, who had been presumed dead. Whereas J. M. DeMatteis saw his series as an opportunity to explore Namor much more deeply than he had been able to in the team book The Defenders, John Byrne felt that the character did not work well outside of a group context and accordingly gave Namor, the Sub-Mariner a massive supporting cast.

The 12-issue miniseries Namor (June 2003–May 2004), credited to co-writers Bill Jemas (then Marvel's president) and Andi Watson, and penciled initially by Salvador Larroca and later by Pat Olliffe and others, explored Namor's youth, charting his teenage romance with a young American girl in the early 20th century. A six-issue miniseries, Sub-Mariner vol. 2 (Aug. 2007 – Jan. 2008), by co-writers Matt Cherniss and Peter Johnson and, primarily, artist Phil Briones, introduced Namor's heretofore undisclosed son, Kamar. Namor was featured in his own ongoing series, Namor: The First Mutant, in 2011. The series was cancelled after less than a year into its publication. Namor has also served alongside, or even as a member of, superhero teams – most notably the Defenders, which included Doctor Strange, the Hulk, and the Silver Surfer. Other groups he was associated with included the Avengers; and both the World War II and modern-day versions of the Invaders. Marvel revived The Defenders, with Namor on the team, in December 2011. The series was cancelled after 12 issues. He became one of the main characters, along with the other Illuminati members, in the third volume of New Avengers beginning in 2013.

Fictional character biography

Early life
Namor was born in the capital city of the Atlantean empire, then located under the Antarctic ice pack. His mother was Emperor Thakorr's daughter, Fen, and his father an American sea captain, Leonard McKenzie, of the icebreaker Oracle; they had fallen in love and married aboard ship while she was, unbeknownst to him, spying on the human intruders. When Fen did not return, Atlantean warriors attacked the Oracle, evidently killing Captain McKenzie, and returned Fen to her kingdom. The pink-skinned mutant Namor was subsequently born among the blue-skinned Atlanteans. He became the Prince of Atlantis, and a warrior for his people against the "surface-dwellers".

At some point, when Namor was a child, the people of Atlantis relocated and built a new kingdom near the Pacific Northwest. There, Namor would befriend a young girl named Sandy Pierce, the daughter of wealthy businessman Henry Pierce. During this time, Namor would also meet his cousin Namora, who was named after him. Years later as a teenager, Namor would reconnect with Sandy, revealing his identity to her and starting a relationship. Due to oil leaking from the ground into Atlantis, and Sandy's father facing financial ruin due to problems with his oil rig, Namor struck a deal with Henry to help each other out. In an attempt to discredit Namor in the eyes of the Atlanteans, his cousin Beemer first attacked Sandy and her father and destroyed the oil rig. With the oil threatening to poison them, the Atlanteans had to relocate back to the South Pacific Ocean. Sandy decided to join them, but would disappear. When Namor was a teenager, he witnessed the Chasm People's Swift Tide in combat practice until his royal cousin Lady Dorma arrived. He even witnesses a meeting between Atlantis and the Chasm People where he has his first encounter with Prince Attuma. When some Chasm People appear to take on the Imperial Atlanteans and the traitorous Swift Tide, Namor and Lady Dorma are awestruck of the Swift Tide's fighting skills as they and Attuma assist in the battle. When it came to a dark artifact called the Unforgotten Stone, the Swift Tide is sent to retrieve it.

World War II
In 1939, Namor became friends with New York City policewoman Betty Dean, who pleaded with him to help the Allies' effort against the Axis powers during World War II. Despite originally denying her pleas, and attacking New York on multiple occasions due to their provocations, Namor decided to join the Allies' cause against the Nazis in September 1940. After the attack on Pearl Harbor and the US officially joining the war in 1941, Namor formed superhero team the Invaders, alongside Captain America, Bucky, the original Human Torch, and Toro. In 1944, Namor and the Invaders would go to Wakanda, where they encountered T'Chaka, the king and Black Panther of the nation. Namor would later find both contention and companionship in youthful monarch T'Challa. The pair of kings would briefly work together to track down traitors and enemies along with missing subjects of their respective kingdoms for a time. Succeeding in their mission, Namor and T'Challa would part on friendly terms afterwards, the former being dismayed after hearing of his land-born counterpart's opening suzerainties to the rest of the world later on.

The Sub-Mariner befriended the family of fellow World War II veteran Randall Peterson some time after the war, yet long before losing his memories during the fight with Destine. While living among them, after losing and regaining himself once more in their company, Namor would soon be approached by Professor Charles Xavier and later joined him in search of fellow mutants for a time. His travels with Xavier revealed Namor's emotional imbalance, due to wartime PTSD. In an attempt to heal Namor's mental trauma, Xavier instead worsened it, causing the manifestation of a delusion—modeled after Thomas Machan, another war buddy Namor had lost to the Nazi Party many decades prior—to short out his memories again. The Sub-Mariner subsequently flew off in a rage that solidified the bipolar disorder he would suffer from throughout his life to date.

The Fantastic Four and modern world
Namor was injured after the Genus incident in Stony Plain, Alberta. He was later found in Fantastic Four #4 living in the flophouse Bowery district of Manhattan as an amnesiac derelict. Regaining his memory, he became enraged upon learning that his people's city had been destroyed by nuclear testing, its inhabitants evacuated. Namor vows revenge on humanity, but after several attacks thwarted by superheroes, including in Fantastic Four #6, 9, and 14 (Sept. and Dec. 1962, May 1963), Strange Tales #107 (April 1963), he finds his people and launches an unsuccessful invasion of New York City in Fantastic Four Annual #1 (1963).

Prior to Namor's first battle with the Avengers, he comes across a group of Inuit worshiping a figure frozen in ice; someone whom the Sub-Mariner vaguely recognizes from the past just before hurling said monolith into the ocean during an outburst of rage. After his second bout with the Avengers he is approached by then-ally in the war turned adversary in modern times; Captain Steven Rogers, the two catching up about life and times. Namor returns to Atlantis to marry his royal cousin Lady Dorma. In Sub-Mariner #37 (May 1971), the evil princess Llyra of Lemuria, another undersea culture, kidnaps and replaces Dorma at the wedding, hoping to usurp Namor's kingdom. Though Namor's marriage to Dorma is still official, she dies as a result of Llyra's machinations. In issues #45–46 (Nov.-Dec. 1971) Namor finally meets his father, long thought dead, only to lose him when Leonard McKenzie gives his life in battle against the supervillain Tiger Shark. Namor allies with the "non-team" the Defenders initially in Marvel Feature #1–3, Dec. 1971 – June 1972, then in the series The Defenders. After being deposed from his throne, Namor joins the superhero team the Avengers. He is briefly married to Marrina, an aquatic alien and a member of the Canadian super-team Alpha Flight. She is later presumed killed, but she is later revealed to be in a coma, of which Namor is unaware.

Father-daughter oceanographers Caleb and Carrie Alexander, theorizing that Namor's propensity toward rage is due to his half-human half-Atlantean blood chemistry, equip Namor with a monitor to warn when he has to seek either air or water. This allows Namor to control his metabolism. He collects sunken treasures to finance his secret purchase of a corporation he renames Oracle Inc., which he turns to conservation and environmental purposes. Unbeknownst to the Sub-Mariner, the Machan guilt apparition would secretly influence his actions, leading him to turn willing Atlantean soldiers human for the purpose of infiltrating governments. Later, Namor loses his ankle-wings during a battle with the animated garbage-monster Sluj, but they are later restored. Namor travels to the dimension of K'un-L'un, where he finds and retrieves the superhero Iron Fist, who had been presumed dead. Namor reclaims the throne of Atlantis, and Oracle begins sponsoring the charitable super-group Heroes for Hire. In the one-shot New Avengers: Illuminati (May 2006), Namor is revealed to have been a member for several years of the clandestine policy group the Illuminati, with Mister Fantastic, Iron Man, Doctor Strange, Professor X, and Black Bolt. In the series Sub-Mariner vol. 2 #1–6 (Aug. 2007–Jan. 2008), he discovers his long-lost son Kamar, who attempts to usurp the throne of Atlantis but is killed by the supervillain Nitro.

In 2011, Namor joined the mutant superhero team the X-Men. Namor helped with the Curse of the Mutants, and Avengers vs. X-Men events before joining the Illuminati and All-New Invaders. That same year, during the "Fear Itself" storyline, Namor is ousted from his kingdom by Attuma, who was transformed into Nerkodd: Breaker of Oceans. Namor assists the X-Men, who have relocated to Utopia, off the coast of San Francisco, and sides with them during the subsequent war with the Avengers over the coming of the Phoenix Force to Earth. He becomes one of the Phoenix Five when the Phoenix Force is fractured between himself, Cyclops, Emma Frost, Colossus and Magik. He eventually becomes the first of the Phoenix Five to fall. Namor rejoins the Illuminati, but believing the group's morality holds it back, he assembles a new group, the Cabal, to deal with interdimensional incursions. Namor and the Cabal eventually escape to another Earth, this one in the Ultimate Universe. The new Squadron Supreme decapitates Namor in retaliation for the worlds destroyed by the Cabal, but this is undone through time travel.

During the "Secret Empire" storyline, Captain America puts Namor into a position where he is forced to sign a peace treaty that for a time enabled Hydra to access a fragment of the Cosmic Cube stored in Atlantis. In reality, Namor secretly aids the Underground resistances against Hydra, after finding Winter Soldier falling to the sea out of nowhere and cover his track from Hydra by disguising him as his bodyguard, having had realized that the Steve Rogers-Captain America he and his fellow resistances saw now is not the man they once knew. Once Captain America returns and gives hope to his fellow heroes to find the Cosmic Cube fragments before Hydra does, Namor tells Winter Soldier that the time has come to remove the latter's disguise and help their fellow allies against Hydra, and returning the real Steve Rogers they knew.

Marvel Legacy & Fresh Start (2017–present)

X-Men Red and West Coast Avengers
Sometime after the fall of Hydra America, Jean Grey of the X-Men implored Namor's support for backing a new mutant nation under her and her uncanny family's care. He lent the support of his own nation to her cause and worked with his fellow mutants in the battle against Cassandra Nova as she manipulated national powers against Homo superior on a global scale. Donning the colors of X once again to resist a nanorobotic sentinel attack instigated by Xavier's evil shadow while allied with various groups to oppose her. Relapsing into his human-hating ways, Namor went back to concocting war plans against the surface nations of the world. When Professor Charles Xavier offered Namor sanctuary in the new mutant nation of Krakoa, the somber monarch refused Xavier's request on the grounds that neither Xavier nor the mutant nation actually believed themselves to be superior to those from whom they had finally separated themselves, and demanded that Xavier not contact his royal person until Xavier believed in his own supremacy. Elsewhere, in Los Angeles, while explaining her backstory to Gwen Poole, Ramone Watts infers that both she and her brother Johnny "Fuse" Watts are children of Namor, born to exiled Dora Milaje Zobae.

Forming the Defenders of the Deep
Namor crashes Tiger Shark's battle with Stingray where he demanded their allegiance. When Stingray tried to reason with Namor, he was attacked by the War Sharks summoned by Namor. This caused Tiger Shark to swear his allegiance to Namor. The two of them form the Defenders of the Deep with Orka, Andromeda, Echidna, the Piranhas, Fathom Five members Bloodtide and Manowar, and King Crab. Namor states that the surface-dwellers can have their land and the Avengers while the Defenders of the Deep will protect the oceans and those who live within it. The Defenders of the Deep encountered the Avengers where Captain America voices his disappointment in Namor for Stingray nearly getting killed. Their fight is interrupted by the Winter Guard who are also after the Defenders of the Deep. In the ensuing chaos, Namor and his fascistic sect would escape after the sea king made an example of some piranha men. After the War of the Realms had resolved itself and the world returned to semi-stability, The Sub-Mariner could be seen in an undersea tavern remembering back to glories long past; back to when he was first crowned king of the seas. Only to be reminded that the world is getting more and more unstable due to the greed and carelessness of the surface world after dealing with cybernetically augmented dolphins sent to dispatch him by Roxxon while drinking his problems away While mulling over his myriad of problems the local bartender (unknown to the sea king, a pawn of Mephistopheles) suggests he take his grievances with the heart of the world's problems; The Avengers. while the sullen king is hesitant to follow through on such a standpoint as it would result in massive collateral on both sides of the fence if he were to wage war on the world and this particular adversary, as his nation does not possess the necessary armed force to accomplish such an undertaking. Said pub clerk suggests looking without his nation and finding other adversaries of his nation's greatest enemies. While not particularly interested in searching the surface world for allies against the Avengers, Namor takes his subjects advice to heart and begins using his lingering psychic link with an immortal cosmic raptor to summon it back to Earth. In exchange for the power to deal with the world's protectors he would give himself over to the Phoenix Force in full and burn whole worlds to ash for it.

The Best Defense
The maddened Namor would venture to seek other avenues of consolidating a solid war power while defending the oceans from surface dwellers. Leaving the Defenders of the Deep to protect Hydropolis, the Sub-Mariner would seek out a long defected splinter sect of Atlanteans known as the Vodani to fortify his war on the hated airbreathers, but they had long since sequestered themselves far from the Earth's oceans and onto another planet. Something Namor wouldn't find out until after he went searching for them, unknowingly stumbling onto a plot by demons to destroy the earth for profit. Namor would seek to make an alliance with the Atlantean castaways to bolster his armies. He was led to believe by vanquishing an old foe of their society, they would consider Namor's proposal. But the task of slaying a creature to gain their trust was a snark hunt. A ruse set up by the Vodani King Okun to leave him more vulnerable to a sneak attack they had in store for Namor whether he succeeded or failed. As the Vodani and Okun had grown to despise anything related to what they came to see as impure Atlanteans, opting to kill them on sight rather than parley with them. A furious Namor would do battle with Okun, but found himself to be quickly outmatched and was on the verge of dying. Until he took advantage of certain insights he learned using a portal which led to the Vodani's homeworld from Earth, flying his hateful adversary into the vacuous depths of space where he would suffocate and die, as would have Namor himself if not for the unexpected arrival in the form of a cosmic godsend. Finding aid in an old colleague from his days on the Defenders, Namor learns from Silver Surfer about an old enemy having become a universal threat which is now heading towards the Sol Star System. To feed a cosmic entity known as the Conductor's engine of destruction Nebulon who has parasitically latched onto it via a devils deal conducted by rogue agents of hell, is directing its cosmic furnace towards Vodon to use it to stoke its fire. Unbeknownst to Namor however, a time-tossed Doctor Strange and Hulk were also involved with the calamity sparked by hell and the demon-possessed adversary. While on their end, Namor would make a sacrifice to Okun's daughter Kataw he had killed. Both to save the planet after it was hurled from its orbit as well as undermine its new queen and forge the alliance he had sought in the first place. But the scorned Kataw rebuked his request and uses her power over bio-electricity to fuel the Silver Surfer for the purpose of sending the planet Vodan into a star system with no planets to keep it from freezing to death. His plan now despoiled by his exile from their world, Namor returns to Earth to resume his war with the land dwellers after jokingly citing how the Non-Team up of the Defenders had saved it from annihilation. He then quotes to Silver Surfer that they should all get together and eat shawarma sometime.

Invaders
Namor would again prep to assimilate Atlantean outliers into his military outfit, this time seeking a sect of shock-troopers known as the Sea Blades whom defected from Atlantis over a decade ago due to their future king's surface heritage. They found yet another separatist sect whom they had intermingled with while sequestered away from the main city. As the Sea Blades prepped to assail their returned leader, Namor showcased his newfound water-shifting abilities by parting the oceans and leaving the Sea Blades and their leader to asphyxiate unless they ceded leadership to him. After said altercation, he would go over his war plans with the ingratiated marine admiral Karris as the rest of his forces made their pilgrimage back to Atlantis. So awestruck was the once disavowing naval enforcer that he immediately signed on with Namor's plan to change the world.

Revealing that in secret with his guide Machan which only Namor can see and interact with. Namor's Atlantean technicians have been fabricating some kind of bomb that will target specific human DNA. To that end, he would incarcerate the criminal Hydro-Man to siphon his power over water into himself. When his former friend Captain America presented himself to the Atlanteans to broker an agreement with Namor, he attacked Captain America in a rage while ranting about how Atlantis has taken the heat of the surface world's battles time and time again. Once more showcasing his power over the water by parting the oceans after shattering Roger's breathing helmet, Namor lets Steve go while telling him the next time they met, there would be no mercy.

The now deranged sea king is further coaxed by his mental instability, secretly conversing with Roman Peterson; Nay Peterson's only son, both of whom are working as a covert agents in Namor's employ. Deploying his long secreted biochemical weapon transforming countless homo sapiens into homo mermanus genetics through private channels.

Machan continually coaxing Namor to dispatch the Peterson's to tie up loose ends after hearing about Steve and Jim's chasing leads as to what his plans are.

When he reached the Peterson abode however, they were already there inquiring about Namor's past with their family and Professor X. He immediately went on the warpath dispatching Cap by tossing him into the deep ocean, simultaneously dealing with Hammond whom went to save him, but as he Saw Randall dying of geriatric complications the two had a short conversation before the senior citizen died. Causing the former to fly away in tears.

With everything prepped and ready Namor's plan begins to unfold, intercepting Hammond over the skyline of Boston, Maine where he summarily decapitates the android to so Roman can launch a missile strike against Atlantis.

Captain America makes it onto the scene too late while the Avengers make a failed incursion attempt on the sunken city, while battling his former friend Namor reveals this was all part of his grand plan however. Using Atlantean spies within the American government to instigate a retaliatory response, Atlantis launching their own missile strike as an intended consequence.

Unleashing the chemical dispersal he and other's had been working on for decades turning many across the seaboard into water breathers while the Avengers act in defense of the kingdom in his absence.

Namor sits alone with his thoughts while the world assembly debates the threat his kingdom and their latest designs present. Machan continues to push the addled ocean lord to pursue his demented quest, but Namor is baffled by news of transformed Russian citizens into Atlanteans making their way to his domain as he never sanctioned it.

The weary Namor questions Machan as the mental manifest was working without Namor's consent again, Namor argues with his mania just as an emissary of the search team return with an item of interest his liege might require. The latter saying that the Serpent Crown will stabilize the fragility in his fractured psyche as they prepare to strike down approaching enemies before they can attack.

Feeling uncomfortable in his own skin, Namor would make contact with his former associate Bucky. Inviting him to meet at a local tavern to discuss things. The latter is naturally untrusting, given that Namor's infiltrators shot Barnes in the back of the head with his own gun, all while stealing necessary components for his latest doomsday project. Namor comes clean about his mental problems and how he's barely in control of his actions anymore, revealing to the Winter Soldier that for the longest time. The psychic apparition of Thomas Machan has been indirectly pushing his latest agenda for decades since his abrupt falling out with Charles X. Using the DNA of a mutant gene morph to fabricate the chemical agent, he and his soldiers converted people across the globe in various cities into Atlanteans whom he'd suborn into his underwater nation. But after Namor had another violent episode, Bucky reveals he'd brought support in the guise of Susan Storm of the Fantastic Four to subdue him. Namor then revealed his newfound power bestowed by his latest acquisition, using the Serpent Crown to weaken Sue's hold on him with her powers. He would regain a second wind, telekinetically flinging the Invisible Woman aside while snaring Bucky in a water bubble. Whispering the full extent of his plan before flying off to parts unknown.

Somewhere in the Atlantic Trench, Namor has his forces tear into seaside cliffs to extract tons of rock for an unknown purpose. After sending his faithful ward Roman back to Atlantis for wartime preparations Machan shows his increasing distaste in his liege's way of doing things particularly when the master plan is so close to fruition. But the Sub-Mariner rebukes his mental haze stating that he is king and so long as he has the Serpent Crown, his war ghost will continue to do as he is told. While attacking a Roxxon oil rig, he questions why Atlantean forces are slaughtering indiscriminately when he'd only ordered them to dismantle the mining facility. To his shock and agitation, Machan has been secretly using the Crown broadcast other orders behind Namor's back again. After fighting against the Invaders for a little bit Namor retreats back into the sea to confront his apparition, but is surprised to find Roman Peterson waiting for him instead. The hallucination of Thomas reveals to his lesser half that he was no longer a manifestation of Namor's guilt and rage but was now his own entity. Despite his influence, he could not completely subsume Namor's humanity which is why he secretly ordered the acquisition of the Serpent Crown, so he could transfer himself from Namor's mind into that of his protege; Roman Peterson, to act upon what his king will not.

Namor eventually regains his senses and storms off towards Atlantis searching for the figment that'd deceived him. Only to find an infiltration by Roxxon underway, just as Steve and Bucky sneak in to find his transformation compound, upon the king's return. Immediately guessing what it was they were after Namor gives chase running into a Genus changed Captain America upon the Roxxon owned galleon.

They were both cornered when the mercenary unit found them as Steve was stealing the Genus Serum from the original thieves. In the conflict, Namor was rendered human after exposure to his own formula as was Rogers whom'd undergone an Atlantean transformation to infiltrate the city. The former fell overboard with the latter diving in to save him now that he'd been made powerless.

For the next couple of weeks, Steve and Namor forage around a deserted island trying to find a way back to civilization. Namor becoming morose by the fact he'd been rendered human and that the worst side of him had taken over the one person he cared for from the surface world. But cap snaps at Namor for his defeatist attitude, given everything going wrong was his fault to start with; but assures him that despite everyone who once trusted him now want him disposed of. That there's still some goodness in him regardless, to the surprise of both, the island they were on was the testing facility that the Roxxon PMC had secreted the Sub-Mariners Genus Compound too.

Outraged by the atrocity the scientists there were conducting on the wildlife using his work, Namor went into a rage with Steve backing him up due to his vulnerability. But finds himself quickly outmatched when they bring in a mech armed security guard; who chides them both for invading a facility meant to give superpowers to the world.

Quick thinking on Captain America's part saw the sea king restored to full power, but he quickly delved back into his monstrous tendencies by releasing the Genus-altered test subjects upon their cruel lab technicians while feigning to let them go. Although Rogers was appalled at such acts, Namor cared not as he attempted to take his leave while addressing Machan and his machinations were no longer his concern. Cap would have none of that, reciting that everything that went down was on him and he needed to fix his mistakes. Reminding Namor they both made a promise to one another years ago, demanding his former comrade to make good on it now. While on the way to intercept the Merchen/Roman amalgam from initiating their final plan, Namor comes clean about the penultimate design of the Omega Sea.

Using a weather-control device based on Hydro-Man's powers, Namor had intended to siphon water from the oceanic world of Vodon through a portal used to travel there. Resulting class 5 superstorms that would enact heavy rains to flood the planet, all as a means to an end to coerce the nations of the world into taking the Genus Serum to survive the rising tide; as well as swearing fealty to Atlantis and its king. Just as the plan was getting underway, the invaders launched their assault on The Spear; the Atlantean apparatus being used to drown the world. In the ensuing battle, Namor falls under Machan's sway via the serpent crown and temporarily waylays Captain Rogers while attempting to aid his former compatriot.

Despite falling under his sway, it become evident to Cap that his assailant was resisting his war ghosts control to an extent. After being aided into resisting the Id creatures commands Namor and Captain America launch a counterattack. Machan tries to control them both through the crown but they rebuke his mental domination and defeat him just as the other Invaders disable his doomsday engine. Namor intends to take the Machan hosted Roman back to Atlantis to face judgement; but Steve debunks his claim stating he must be taken into surface-dwelling custody as the world still thinks Namor was behind everything that went down with his schemes and invasion tactics. Recounting how a king sacrifices for the sake of the greater good; Rogers dares his former war buddy to forgo his vengeful needs for the sake of his kingdom.

Atlantis Attacks
In the Atlantis Attacks storyline, Namor discovers that Atlantis' sacred guardian dragon has been stolen by the Big Nguyen Company and are using her magic to power the portal city of Pan. An enraged Namor begins invading the portal city by summoning tidal waves along the coasts of the Shanghai, Seoul and Manila sectors of Pan and demands the release of the dragon. Namor is stopped by Brawn, who warns Namor that immediately releasing the dragon would cause Pan's portals to collapse, putting its citizens' lives at risk. Unconvinced, Namor continues his assault, only to stop when the New Agents of Atlas arrive to back Brawn up. Before retreating, Namor warns the group to return the dragon within a day or face the wrath of Atlantis. During a conversation with his vizier, Namor reveals he has actually taken Cho's warnings to heart. While wishing to avoid killing thousands of innocents and not particularly reverent of a mean spirited reptile that kills its handlers, Namor remains steadfast in his dedication to protecting Atlantis' honor. When Atlas' founder Jimmy Woo sends Namora, Venus, Aero and Wave to Atlantis for a diplomatic mission, Namor warmly greets Wave, due to her recent role in defeating the Sirenas, longtime enemies of Atlantis. After the dragon is safely released from captivity, Namor reassures Brawn over a hologram conversation of the dragon's obedience upon her return home. However, the dragon suddenly goes berserk upon her arrival and attacks the underwater city. To which, whence the dragon had been subdued, Atlantean scientists discover the source of the creature's behavior. That being an implant embedded in her scales. Before discovering this however, Namor accuses Brawn to be behind the deception and immediately flies to Pan for revenge, violently ambushing Brawn and proceeding to attack the Big Nguyen Company's CEO and Pan's founder Mike Nguyen in his personal tower, but is stopped by the combined efforts of the Pan Guard and Amadeus, who sends Namor flying back into the ocean. While the rest of Agents of Atlas, old and new, prepare themselves for another attack from Namor, Nguyen reveals that he has also recruited the Sirenas to help defend Pan from Atlantis. While fighting Brawn, Namor provokes Cho into mutating into his Hulk form but manages to defeat the Atlas team leader. Before he could land the final blow, Namor is overpowered by the Sirenas and imprisoned by Nguyen. Despite being dehydrated by biodisrupters, Namor is able to break free from his restraints. Namor swiftly subdues the combined group and flies back to the heart of Pan, threatening Nguyen and Pan's citizens as retribution for attacking his kingdom. A hologram of Nguyen offers an alliance between Pan, Atlantis and the Sirenas to Namor; before the king could retort the recovered Agents are able to catch up to Namor and resume fighting him. Brawn talks down the combatants and confronts Woo over the secrets that he's withheld from the team. Woo reveals to all that for thousands of years, ancient dragons have served as advisors for human rulers, with the Atlas Foundation having its own dragon, Mr. Lao, serving him as well. As fighting each other openly would raze the planet, dragons have used humans as proxies in their own personal conflicts against each other, making them responsible for almost every major war in history, including the one between Pan and Atlantis. Woo is content with this balance of power, but Nguyen suggests uniting the world under Pan, proposing to Namor and Woo that by harvesting the power of their dragons, they could overtake the rest of them. As Namor returns to Atlantis with Namora, Venus and Aero, the rest of the Agents uncover Nguyen in his personal bunker and confront him. Having anticipated this, Nguyen attaches a Sirena tech implant onto Amadeus, transforming him into the Hulk. To prevent any further invasions against Pan, Nguyen commands the Hulk to kill Namor. In Atlantis, just as Wave is able to get Namor and the Sirenas to come to a truce, Silk warns the group a mind-controlled Hulk is on his way to destroy Atlantis. With help from the Agents, Namor is able to isolate himself and the Hulk to a deserted island two miles from the Heart of Pan for their fight. As the Hulk pummels Namor, Sword Master distracts him long enough for Shang-Chi to remove the device, freeing Amadeus from Nguyen's control and reverting him back to Brawn. Unfortunately they are too late, as the shockwaves emitted by Amadeus as the Hulk have created a massive tsunami that is heading towards the Heart of Pan. With some goading from Woo and Namor, Brawn transforms back into Hulk and creates another shockwave to weaken the tsunami with help from Namor, Wave, Aero and Luna Snow. The city is saved, although Nguyen dies protecting a Madripoorian refugee and her young son from the tsunami. One month later at the Heart of Pan, Woo announces to the Agents and Pan's new leadership at a banquet that Atlantis and the Sirenas have signed a non-aggression pact, recognizing Pan as an independent nation. Mr. Lao and Woo plan their next move with the Agents: helping Namor fight the King in Black.

King in Black
During the "King in Black" storyline, Namor recounts his history with the Swift Tide and the exile of the Chasm People. When Knull attacks Earth, Namor agrees to help his fellow superheroes. One way to fight Knull's symbiote forces is to awaken the Black Tide. Upon Namor's arrival, Iron Man agrees to help him if the Black Tide attack Namor.

Enter the Phoenix
After the Phoenix Force makes its nest near Avengers Mountain in the North Pole, Namor attempts to reunite with the entity, leading to a clash between the Avengers and the Defenders of the Deep. During the battle, the Phoenix decides to hold a tournament to decide who its next host will be and selects Namor as a candidate, transporting him and many other heroes and villains to another dimension to wait the next match following Captain America's win over Doctor Doom.

Powers and abilities
Because of his unusual genetic heritage, Namor is unique among both ordinary humans and Atlanteans; he is sometimes referred to as "Marvel's first mutant" because, while the majority of his observed superhuman powers come from the fact that he is a hybrid of human and Atlantean DNA, his ability to fly cannot be explained by either side (Atlanteans are an offshoot of "baseline" humanity); however, in terms of in-continuity chronology, there were many mutants in existence before Namor. Namor possesses a fully amphibious physiology suited for extreme undersea pressures, superhuman strength, speed, agility, durability, flight, and longevity. Namor has the ability to survive underwater for indefinite periods, and specially developed vision which gives him the ability to see clearly in the murky depths of the ocean.

Bill Everett, in his first Sub-Mariner story, described the character as "an ultra-man of the deep [who] lives on land and in the sea, flies in the air, [and] has the strength of a thousand [surface] men". No other powers were mentioned. When the series was revived in 1954, Namor lost his ankle wings and with them the power of flight; they, and his full strength, were restored in Sub-Mariner Comics #38 (Feb. 1955), in which Everett additionally wrote a flashback story, "Wings on His Feet", detailing their appearance on Namor at age 14. This story was twice reprinted during the Silver Age of Comic Books, in Marvel Super-Heroes #17 (Nov. 1968), and in the book Comix by Les Daniels.

Namor has the ability to swim at superhuman speeds, even by Atlantean standards.

Namor has greater longevity than a normal human being. He is nearly 100 years old, but has the appearance of a male in his prime.

His enhanced senses enable him to see in the deepest ocean depths, hear when a school of fish turn a corner from a world away and even feel when the deepest currents change by the slightest degree.

In all his incarnations, Namor possesses superhuman strength and, with the possible exceptions of Orka and Tyrak at their full sizes, is the strongest Atlantean ever known. The exact level of his strength is dependent upon his physical contact with water, in which he needn't be submerged. It has been shown as sufficient to effortlessly toss a water-filled ocean-liner, despite the underwater viscosity. His strength diminishes slowly the longer he is out of contact with water, though an extended period on land does not result in his death, as it would for a typical Atlantean, and his power is retained in full as long as he keeps himself wet. Namor possesses superhuman stamina and resistance to injury due to his hybrid nature. Namor's strength level is such that he has held his own in hand-to-hand combat with beings as powerful as the Hulk in the past.

Some stories have mentioned that Namor has gills for breathing underwater, e.g., in Namor, the Sub-Mariner #5, Namor thinks "this New York river water burns my gills and scalds my lungs". and artists such as Salvador Larroca have drawn him with gill slits on either side of his neck. In The Sub-Mariner #18–22 (1969–70), beings from outer space surgically closed Namor's gills for a time, leaving him with the ability to breathe air but unable to breathe underwater. Other sources have stated that his lungs contain oxygen diffusing membranes that allow him to breathe underwater.

Namor possesses a telepathic rapport with all forms of marine life. He is able to mentally communicate with most forms of Ichthyoid, Cephalopod, Plankton, Anthozoa, Csnidarian, etc.; and can mentally persuade them to do his bidding. Namor can mentally communicate with other Atlanteans and give mental-telepathic orders to all his men. He had a limited empathic rapport with Namorita, but only as a result of being given one of her "magic earrings" (which has long since disappeared).

Due to a unique aspect of his hybrid nature, not shared by Namorita, it was theorized that Namor is vulnerable to oxygen imbalances in his blood that trigger manic-depressive mood swings; he can prevent imbalances by regular immersion in water.

Namor was educated by the royal tutors of the Atlantean court, and speaks many surface languages, Atlantean, and Lemurian. He is a highly skilled business executive. On top of having a slew of vast Atlantean technologies available to him and his forces, Namor also has a slew of powerful mystical relics in his national treasury he regularly makes use of; like the Trident of Neptune, patron weapon of his kingdom's founding sea god Poseidon.

The weapon supposedly comes with many replicas as an adversary who held the sea king in resentment due to prior infractions he had in the past utilized a true oceanic scepter while Namor held only a ceremonial copy. Said recipient would study up on the lore of Atlantis's mythical, mystical background and discovered a hidden treasure cove pertaining to numerous magical relics in the ocean deity's possession. One that would enable he and all others who wielded it power over the waters of the world and the vast metaphysical might of its namesake to which they could accomplish a great many feats. Other powers include that of physical transformation, such as changing a human into merfolk, firing destructive energy beams, commanding the creatures of the brine to act on its wielders behalf, as well as influence both weather and the tides of the world to do their bidding. Like all weapons and reliquary crafted by and for the Olympian Pantheon, such as Heracles' Adamantine Mace, the trident is composed of indestructible metal belonging to the gods, able to battle against multiple enforcers of the Thor Corps and their legions of Mjolnir hammers without taking any damage.

In the past Namor has interacted with the Serpent Crown throughout his adventures, in later publishing he has regained access to all of its supernatural facilities to augment his own powers.

Former powers and abilities
In The Fantastic Four #9 (Dec. 1962), Namor states, "I have the powers of all the creatures who live beneath the sea! I can charge the very air with electricity – using the power of the electric eel!" In the same issue, "the radar sense of the cave fish from the lowest depths of the sea" enables him to sense the presence of Sue Storm when she is invisible. He uses "the power to surround himself with electricity in the manner of an electric eel" again in Strange Tales #107 (April 1963), and #125 (Oct. 1964); in the former, he manifests the power to inflate his body like a puffer fish. An editorial note in Marvel Tales #9 (July 1967), which reprinted the story from Strange Tales #107, stated explicitly that "nautical Namor has since lost his power to imitate the characteristics of fish..." His electrical abilities were seen in later comics, and in the 1991 Spider-Man: The Video Game.

In Marvel Mystery Comics #2 (Dec. 1939) Namor once boasted a personal hydration function of his physiology, once extinguishing a pedestrian had been set on fire by cigarette light. His body excreted water from his individual pores, dousing the flames. During Namor's original fight with the Human Torch in Marvel Mystery Comics #8 (June 1940, and the first fight between superheroes at Marvel), Namor was able to forcibly expel water from his body to extinguish fires, although it proved useless against the Torch.

Namor was given possession of the Time Gem which he did not use. This gem allows the user total control over the past, present, and future. It allows time travel, can age and de-age beings, and can be used as a weapon by trapping enemies or entire worlds in unending loops of time. After the Hood attempted to steal the Gems, Namor briefly helped Thor recover the Gem from the bottom of the ocean to prevent the Hood acquiring it, before being entrusted with the Power Gem as the Gems were divided amongst the new Illuminati – Steve Rogers replacing Black Bolt – once again.

Through unknown means, Namor later siphoned the hydrokinesis abilities of Hydro-Man. He was able to flood a prison cell containing Roxxon murderers miles away from the ocean using the penal facility's sewage line. When he went to conscript the Sea Blades in preparation for war on the surface world, he literally parting the seas around them only to drop the waters back into place.

Namor was host for a fifth of the Phoenix Force as one of the Phoenix Five. He lost the Phoenix Force in battle with the Scarlet Witch. He summoned the Phoenix Force to regain those powers, but the Phoenix decided to choose its next host in a tournament. Each candidate, including Namor, was temporarily given a portion of the Phoenix Force, until Echo was chosen as its new host.

"Marvel's first mutant"
Marvel has repeatedly identified Namor as "Marvel's first mutant", which is accurate when describing first appearances in print. However, he is not the oldest mutant within the fictional Marvel Universe timeline. A number of mutants predate him, including Selene, Apocalypse, Exodus, Wolverine, Mystique, and Destiny.

In X-Men #6 (July 1964), X-Men leader Professor Xavier and antagonist Magneto each suspect Namor is a mutant and make efforts to recruit him. Later writers in the 1960s and 1970s described him as a hybrid, not a mutant, to distinguish him from the mutant X-Men. When the series was revived in 1990, the series title logo carried the subtitle "Marvel's first and mightiest mutant!"

Namor is actually a hybrid of Atlantean and human physiology, although he has principal characteristics that neither Atlanteans (Homo mermanus) nor humans (Homo sapiens) possess. These include his ability to fly, and possibly his durability and strength (which is several times that of an Atlantean).

In the first issue of the five-part Illuminati miniseries, after being experimented on by the Skrulls, it was confirmed that Namor is not only an Atlantean/human hybrid but also a mutant.

Enemies
 Attuma – Leader of the Atlantean barbarians, Attuma would threaten Atlantis repeatedly; conquering it on several occasions, and became Namor's nemesis.
 Byrrah – Childhood friend and rival to Namor, Byrrah was Atlantean royalty that lost the throne to Namor and observed him as unfit for the position. For many years, he would challenge Namor's rule and ally with his enemies to usurp him. Eventually, he appears to have made peace with Namor and stands by his side as a brother.
 Captain Barracuda – A modern-day pirate employing advanced technology that frequently crossed swords with Namor (and several other heroes).
 Deep Six – A group formed by Attuma to maintain his rule of Atlantis during one of his periods as its conqueror. His subordinates included Tiger Shark, Orka, Piranha, Sea Urchin, and Nagala (bearing the Serpent Crown).
 Doctor Doom – Sometimes allies, sometimes enemies, Doom and Namor use each other but inevitably turn against each other when their ultimate sensibilities override the benefits of working together. This has been their perpetual relationship since first meeting years ago.
 Doctor Dorcas – A brilliant scientist that created several of Namor's greatest threats such as Tiger Shark, Orka, and Piranha, often working alongside the likes of Attuma and Byrrah. He appeared to die in a battle with Namor, but later turned up alive with starfish-based abilities.
 Fathom Five – Led by Llyron, the son of Namor's enemy Llyra and supposedly Namor himself. Later, it is revealed that Llyron is the grandson of Namor's half-brother that was passed off as Namor's successor who usurped his throne, Fathom Five sought to wipe out humanity. Its members include Dragonrider, Bloodtide, Manowar, and Sea Leopard.
 Great White – An albino villain and shark trainer. He ambushed Loa and her father while they were surfing. Loa managed to use her ability to kill the sharks while Great White was defeated by Namor.
 Karthon the Quester – A faithful servant to Lemurian ruler Naga that sought the Serpent Crown for his master from Namor. His sense of honor conflicted with his master and after Naga's rule was toppled, Karthon became king and an ally to Namor.
 Llyra – A Lemurian that usurped Karthon's rule of his kingdom and became Namor's enemy when he tried to restore his friend and ally. She would return to face him repeatedly, in time becoming high priestess of Set.
 Magneto – More often amicable allies than anything else, Magneto would approach Namor during his Brotherhood's first outing as Supervillains to join forces against humanity. Initially, the latter refused, seeking to work alone, but having worked with the X-Men, Magnus included, Namor respects the mutant revolutionary nonetheless.
 Naga – Longtime wielder of the Serpent Crown, Naga would rule Lemuria until he was murdered by his staunchest aide Karthon.
 Orka – An underling of Krang empowered by Doctor Dorcas to be massively strong and grow stronger in the presence of orca. He would return repeatedly as a minion for Namor's enemies.
 Piranha – Created by Doctor Dorcas, the Piranha is an ever-evolving enemy of Namor to return again and again.
 Puppet Master – Using Namor as a pawn on several occasions, such as against the Fantastic Four and in obtaining funds, the Puppet Master would garner the ire of the sea king. On one occasion, when Namor considered befriending the Hulk, Puppet Master took the green behemoth over and forced him to battle Namor.
 Tiger Shark – An Olympic swimmer transformed by Doctor Dorcas into a hybrid of Namor's DNA and a tiger shark. He battles Namor repeatedly over the years, at one time an ally to the sea king, though today he has again chosen to be his enemy.
 Tyrak – A powerful warrior in Attuma's army that can grow to monstrous size and bears incredible physical strength.
 U-Man – Meranno was a childhood rival to Namor that joined the Third Reich and took the name U-Man. Leading the Nazis to Atlantis, their attack left its emperor in a coma with Namor succeeding him. During World War II, he would be Namor's frequent sparring partner.
 Warlord Krang – One-time military leader of Atlantis' forces, Krang tried to usurp Namor's power and became an enemy to the kingdom. He would return repeatedly to challenge Namor.

Reception

Volumes 
During the period known as the Golden Age of Comic Books—generally agreed to last from 1938 to 1956—Namor was one of Timely Comics' Big Three alongside Captain America and the original Human Torch. During this period, Namor's Sub-Mariner title was selling millions of copies.

Accolades 

 In 2008, Wizard magazine ranked Namor 88th in their "The 200 Greatest Comic Book Characters of All Time" list.
 In 2011, IGN ranked Namor 77th in their "Top 100 Comic Book Heroes" list.
 In 2012, IGN ranked Namor 14th in their "Top 50 Avengers" list.
 In 2013, ComicsAlliance ranked Namor 16th in their "50 Sexiest Male Characters in Comics" list.
 In 2015, Gizmodo ranked Namor 29th in their "Every Member Of The Avengers" list.
 In 2015, Entertainment Weekly ranked Namor 47th in their "Let's rank every Avenger ever" list.
 In 2018, Comicbook.com ranked Namor 4th in their "8 Best Black Panther Villains" list.
 In 2018, GameSpot ranked Namor 35th in their "50 Most Important Superheroes" list.
 In 2018, CinemaBlend included Namor in their "5 Marvel Villains We'd Love To See In Black Panther 2" list.
 In 2018, Comicbook.com included Namor the Submariner in their "7 Great Villains for Black Panther 2" list.
 In 2019, Comicbook.com ranked Namor 43rd in their "50 Most Important Superheroes Ever" list.
 In 2021, Screen Rant included Namor in their "15 Most Powerful Black Panther Villains" list. 
 In 2021, CBR.com ranked Namor 2nd in their "10 Strongest Aquatic Superheroes" list. 
 In 2021, Looper ranked Namor 12th in their "Strongest Superheroes In History" list. 
 In 2021, Collider included Namor in their "7 Most Powerful Avengers Who Aren't in the MCU" list. 
 In 2022, Screen Rant ranked Namor 1st in their "Marvel's 10 Most Powerful Aquatic Characters" list, and included him in their "10 Most Powerful Hercules Villains In Marvel Comics" list, in their "10 Best Black Panther Comics Characters Not In The MCU" list, and in their "MCU: 10 Most Desired Fan Favorite Debuts Expected In The Multiverse Saga" list.
 In 2022, CBR.com ranked Namor 1st in their "10 Most Iconic Black Panther Villains" list.

Other versions

Marvel Noir
In the Marvel Noir reality, Namor is a captain of a ship named "Dorma". Captain Namor is a widely infamous pirate of the seven seas and an associate of Tony Stark, who pays him for the numerous voyages on his adventures. Namor considers himself as a man of the sea and doesn't share any allegiances to any countries or nations. As part of his tradition as a pirate, Namor marks himself and his crew by slicing their ears to look like shark's fins. He is the captain of the Dorma, an advanced submarine while taking the guise of a fishing trawler.

In May 1939, Stark hired Namor to find the location of Atlantis. He traveled with Stark, James Rhodes, and Pepper Potts on the submersible, the "Happy Hogan", in locating Atlantis and finding the valuable Orichalcum. Upon returning to the surface, Namor and his friends were immediately captured by the Nazis led by Baron Zemo and Von Strucker, and the Orichalcum stolen by them. Namor and his allies were then left to die on his trawler by torpedo; Namor took action in having everyone quickly board the Dorma and escape before the torpedo destroyed the trawler. Namor later rescued Stark following the destruction of Von Strucker's airship fleet, as (in Namor's words) Stark owes him a boat for the destruction of his.

MC2
Namor is still active in the MC2 future timeline, and still uniting occasionally for battle alongside the Hulk and Doctor Strange as "Defenders". His appearance, while slightly older looking, is unchanged save for growing a goatee. In Fantastic Five vol. 2 #1 it was revealed that he had held Doctor Doom captive for over ten years after the mad monarch destroyed Atlantis. Doom subsequently escaped, and in #4, Namor is seen being tortured by him. He is freed after Reed Richards sacrifices himself to send both his and Doom's consciousnesses to the Crossroads of Infinity.

Ultimate Marvel
The Ultimate version of Namor is a mutant Atlantean with amphibious physiology suited for high water pressure. He has vast super strength, durability, high-speed swimming ability, flight, and water manipulation.

In Ultimate Fantastic Four #24, the eponymous team is surveying the ruins of Atlantis and finds an estimated 9,000-year-old tomb containing the hibernating Namor – an imprisoned Atlantean criminal, considered the worst villain of his time. Reed Richards' translation of the Atlantean language reveals Namor's claims of kingship to be false.

His extreme intelligence allows him to become fluent in English in a matter of minutes merely by listening to S.H.I.E.L.D. agents and the Fantastic Four talking. Confronting the human, Namor withstands full-strength flares from the Human Torch and is strong enough to fight the Thing, withstand Sue Storm's force fields, and stretch Richards (Mr. Fantastic) to near-breaking. He destroys machinery designed to contain the Hulk. Though beaten by the Fantastic Four, he creates a tidal wave in the shape of Poseidon, threatening to destroy Manhattan with it. He is appeased when he demands, and receives, a meaningful kiss from Sue Storm. He then returns to the sea.

Namor reappears at the end of issue #55, rescuing an unconscious Sue after she was attacked by the Ultimate version of the Salem's Seven. Later, he is seen in Latveria as Doom's prisoner.

1602
In the Marvel 1602 limited series Fantastick Four, Namor is reinvented as Numenor, Emperor of Bensaylum, a city beyond the edge of the world.

When the characters arrive in his realm he is arguing with his cousin Rita (Namorita) about her reluctance to marry. She suggests that this is because he refuses to find a consort himself. Upon meeting the Four from the Fantastick, he is attracted to Susan Storm, and attempts to woo her, unsuccessfully. He later plots with Otto von Doom to win her, while "disposing" of Sir Richard Reed. Doom turns against him, and Numenor is stabbed with his own trident and dies. Because Bensaylum is not underwater, its inhabitants are portrayed as basically human although they retain the pointed ears.

Exiles
In Exiles issues 14 and 15, Namor appears as a king who has taken over Latveria. Another version of Namor is black and is married to Sue Storm and has a son Remy.

Earth X
In the Earth X series, Namor suffers from dementia due to the Terrigen mists contaminating the oceans. Amid the crisis, Namor is responsible for the death of Johnny Storm as a result of an attack by him and Dr. Doom on the United Nations against the Fantastic Four and Captain America. A furious Franklin Richards used his powers to cause half of Namor's body to be continually on fire, now known as Namor the Cursed. Years later, Namor would join The Skull's mind-controlled army.

Earth 9602 (Amalgam Comics)
In the Amalgam Comics reality, Namor is combined with DC Comics' King of Atlantis, Aquaman, to create Aqua Mariner.

Sub-Mariner: The Depths
In the Marvel Knights mini-series set in an alternate 1950s, Namor is fabled among mariners, said to pursue and kill any searching for Atlantis. Randolph Stein, a man who makes a living debunking modern myths, encounters Namor in the ocean depths while trying to find Atlantis.

In other media

Television

 In the 1950s, a Namor television series starring Richard Egan was planned, but it never went into production.
 In the 1970s, a Sub-Mariner television pilot was announced, but never filmed. It has been claimed that this was due to its similarity to the short-lived Man from Atlantis. although the veracity of this is disputed  A comic book of the series was published by Marvel.
 Namor appears in a self-titled segment of The Marvel Super Heroes, voiced by John Vernon.
 Namor appears in Fantastic Four (1967), voiced by Mike Road.
 Namor appears in the Spider-Man (1981) episode "Wrath of the Sub-Mariner", voiced by Vic Perrin.
 Namor appears in the Spider-Man and His Amazing Friends episode "7 Little Superheroes", voiced by William Woodson.
 Namor appears in the Fantastic Four (1994) episode "Now Comes the Sub-Mariner", voiced by James Warwick.
 Namor appears in The Avengers: United They Stand episode "To Rule Atlantis", voiced by Raoul Trujillo.
 Namor appears in Fantastic Four: World's Greatest Heroes, voiced by Michael Adamthwaite.

Film
Development of a film based on Namor the Sub-Mariner began at Marvel Studios in April 1997, when Philip Kaufman was negotiating to direct the film, entitled Namor: Sub-Mariner. Kaufman was developing the film the next month when he revealed it would tackle environmental issues by depicting Namor as having "bad feelings" towards the land residents of Earth over ecological concerns. By July 1999, Sam Hamm was in negotiations to write the script. In June 2001, Universal Pictures entered negotiations to gain the rights for Namor, with then Marvel Studios President Avi Arad and Kevin Misher set to produce the film. Arad felt that the film could explore environmental issues such as oil spills, underwater bomb testing, pollution and global warming. By then, writers were being sought for the project. Universal hired David Self to write the script in July 2002 for an intended 2004 release. The following month, Randall Frakes was revealed to have worked on the script for Namor, the Sub-Mariner at Saban Entertainment.

In October 2002, Marvel Studios announced that it had finalized a deal with Universal to produce the Sub-Mariner film after their work together on Hulk (2003). Avi Arad said the film would be an "epic underwater tale of majestic fantasy", which Marvel described as following the adventures of Namor as a prince from Atlantis who is a "half-human/half-amphibian" and a "troubled rebel with a short temper" and has helped humans and fought them over pollution. Kevin Feige, Stan Lee, and Self were set as executive producers, while Avi Arad was a co-producer. By July 2004, Marvel and Arad entered negotiations for Chris Columbus to direct the project, and he signed on as director and producer of Sub-Mariner by that December, developing it through his production company 1492 Pictures. The film was slated for a 2007 release. However, Columbus said in November 2005 that he was unlikely to make the film. In September 2006, Universal and Marvel Studios hired Jonathan Mostow to write and direct The Sub-Mariner, with the film following Namor discovering he is a prince of Atlantis who is key in a war between the modern surface world and the underwater world. Feige said the heart of the film's story would be "tempered" with Namor being stuck between those two worlds. Mostow said The Sub-Mariner was still in active development in August 2009 and that they were still working on getting the script right. He also explained that Universal kept renewing the option to produce the property.

Marvel Entertainment's chief creative officer (CCO) Joe Quesada said in May 2012 that to his knowledge, Marvel Studios held the film rights to Namor. In August 2013, Feige, who since became the President of Marvel Studios, said that Universal still held the rights to Namor and that the character would not appear in Marvel Studios' Marvel Cinematic Universe (MCU) at that time because of it. In April 2014, Feige said the rights to Namor were a "little complicated," while The Hollywood Reporter Borys Kit revealed in May that Marvel held the Namor rights and not Universal. That July, Feige clarified that Marvel could make a Namor film, instead of Universal and Legendary Pictures as was rumored, but noted there were older contracts with other parties that needed to be worked out before they could move forward with a film. In June 2016, Quesada said Marvel had rights to Namor. In February 2017, Production Weekly included The Sub-Mariner in their report of upcoming projects in development, when the production was expected to take place in Hawaii. In April 2018, Feige reiterated Namor's rights were complicated, with Universal holding the distribution rights, and said in October that Namor could appear in the MCU and that Marvel Studios was deciding if and when he could. In November 2022, Marvel Studios executive Nate Moore confirmed that they cannot make a standalone Namor film since Universal still holds the character's distribution rights, similar to the Hulk. In March 2023, Citigroup financial analyst Jason Bazinet felt Disney may try to include the distribution rights to Namor, along with Hulk, in any potential sale of the streaming service Hulu to Comcast, the owner of Universal Pictures through NBCUniversal.

Marvel Cinematic Universe 

Tenoch Huerta portrays K'uk'ulkan / Namor in the MCU film Black Panther: Wakanda Forever (2022). This version is the king of Talokan, an ancient civilization of water-dwelling people connected to the Mayas, as well as a mutant. Namor has an antagonistic role in the film, similar to some versions in the comics. Michael Waldron, the writer for the MCU film Doctor Strange in the Multiverse of Madness (2022), previously said there had been talks about including Namor in that film as a member of the Illuminati, which he was in the comics, but his inclusion was dropped because Marvel Studios had other plans for the character.  In 1571, his mother Fen ingested a vibranium-laced herb to gain immunity from smallpox while pregnant with her son. The effects of the herb caused her and the rest of Yucatán's people to develop blue skin and grow gills that restricted their ability to breathe air on the surface, thus forcing them to relocate underwater and establish Talokan as a new civilization. The herb additionally caused her son to undergo a mutation at birth, which gave him pointed ears and winged ankles enabling him to fly, as well as hybrid human physiology that enabled him to breathe oxygen and water simultaneously. Motivated by his hatred of the surface world, and a recent discovery of a vibranium detection device designed by Riri Williams in the ocean that put his nation at risk, he initially attempted to forge a military alliance with the nation of Wakanda to protect Talokan while supplying their people with his army due to its similarly isolationist nature in exchange for the custody of Williams, to which both Queen Ramonda and Princess Shuri decline. However, after a fight between the two nations, Shuri and Namor come to an alliance, and opt to help each other in the future.

Video games
 Namor appears as a playable character in Spider-Man: The Video Game.
 Namor makes a cameo appearance in Captain America and The Avengers.
 Namor appears as a boss in Fantastic Four (1997).
 Namor makes a cameo appearance in Spider-Man (2000)'s "What If?" mode.
 Namor appears as a playable character in the Game Boy Advance version of Marvel: Ultimate Alliance and as a non-playable character in its other versions, voiced by Peter Renaday.
 Namor appears as a playable character in Marvel Strike Force.
 Namor appears as a playable character in Marvel: Future Fight.
 Namor appears as a playable character in Marvel Super War.

Miscellaneous
Namor appears in the Inhumans motion comic, voiced by Trevor Devall.

Collected editions 
Golden Age

Modern Age

See also
 List of Marvel Comics superhero debuts
 Aquaman - a similar character from DC Comics

References

Bibliography

External links
 Namor at Marvel
 
 Marvel Directory: Namor
 The Sub-Mariner at Don Markstein's Toonopedia
 
 

Avengers (comics) characters
Characters created by Bill Everett
Comics characters introduced in 1939
Fictional activists
Fictional business executives
Fictional characters with slowed ageing
Fictional characters with superhuman durability or invulnerability
Fictional characters with superhuman senses
Fictional characters with water abilities
Fictional empaths
Fictional kings
Fictional princes
Golden Age comics titles
Golden Age superheroes
Marvel Comics Atlanteans (Homo mermanus)
Marvel Comics characters who can move at superhuman speeds
Marvel Comics characters with accelerated healing
Marvel Comics characters with superhuman strength
Marvel Comics hybrids
Marvel Comics male superheroes
Marvel Comics mutants
Marvel Comics orphans
Marvel Comics telepaths
Timely Comics characters
Video game bosses